Kenyon College is a private liberal arts college in Gambier, Ohio. It was founded in 1824 by Philander Chase. Kenyon College is accredited by the Higher Learning Commission.

Kenyon has 1,708 undergraduates enrolled. Its 1,000-acre campus is set in rural surroundings and is home to the Brown Family Environmental Center (BFEC), which has over 380 acres and hosts seven different ecosystems. There are more than 120 student clubs and organizations on campus, including eight fraternities and sororities. Kenyon athletes are called Owls (previously the Lords and Ladies) and compete in the NCAA Division III North Coast Athletic Conference.

History

Founding 

After becoming the first Episcopal Bishop of Ohio in 1818, Philander Chase found a severe lack of trained clergy on the Ohio frontier. He planned to create a seminary to rectify this problem, but could find little support. Undeterred, he sailed to England and solicited donations from: George Kenyon, 2nd Baron Kenyon; Lord Gambier; and the writer and philanthropist Hannah More. The college was incorporated in December, 1824. Dissatisfied with the original location of the college in Worthington, Chase purchased  of land in Knox County (with the Mount Vernon lawyer Henry Curtis), and reached what he would name Gambier Hill on July 24, 1825. There is a legend that Bishop Chase exclaimed, "Well, this will do" upon reaching the crest of the hill.

The Kenyon Review
Kenyon's English department gained national recognition with the arrival of the poet and critic John Crowe Ransom in 1937 as professor of poetry and first editor of The Kenyon Review, a literary journal. During his 21-year tenure, Ransom published such internationally known writers as Allen Tate, Robert Penn Warren, William Empson, Mark Van Doren, Kenneth Burke, and Delmore Schwartz, as well as younger writers like Flannery O'Connor, Robert Lowell, and Peter Taylor, to name a few. It was an influential literary magazine during the 1940s and 1950s.

The Kenyon Review also hosts a two-week summer writing workshop on campus for high-school students. The Review also sponsors an annual summer writers workshop for adults.

Academics 

Kenyon requires students to take classes in each of the four academic divisions: fine arts, humanities, natural sciences, and social sciences. In addition, students must study a foreign language. Its most popular majors, by 2021 graduates, were: English, Economics, Psychology, Political Science, and Biology.

The Gund Gallery, a  visual arts center and exhibition space, was opened in 2011. It hosts lectures, public programming, and exhibitions from traveling shows and its permanent collection.

Admissions 

Admission to Kenyon is considered "most selective" by U.S. News & World Report.

For the class of 2022 (enrolling fall 2018), Kenyon received 6,152 applications, accepted 2,204 (35.8%), and enrolled 539. For enrolled first-year students the middle 50% range of SAT scores was 640-730 for critical reading and 640-740 for math, while the ACT composite range was 29–33; the average GPA was 3.94.

Rankings

In the 2022 U.S. News & World Report rankings, Kenyon is tied for the No. 31 liberal arts college in the United States. In the 2022 Forbes rankings, Kenyon is 40th among liberal-arts colleges and 176th among 650 colleges and universities in the United States. In 2006 Newsweek selected Kenyon College as one of twenty-five "New Ivies" on the basis of admissions statistics as well as interviews with administrators, students, faculty members, and alumni. It was also listed in Greene's list of Hidden Ivies in 2000.

Although Kenyon is often ranked favorably, some methods that rank colleges based on their calculated return on investment (ROI) have been critical of Kenyon's value. The 2018 Payscale College ROI Report ranked Kenyon as the 983rd best value college in the country and Time'''s 2018-2019 "Best Colleges in America" report ranked Kenyon as the 214th best college in the country.

CollegeSimply ranks Kenyon as the 2nd best institution of higher education in Ohio and the 61st best college or university overall.

 Athletics 

Kenyon's sports teams, which compete in the North Coast Athletic Conference (NCAC), were referred to as the Lords and Ladies until May 2022 when a new mascot, the Owls, was announced. At various points in the past, the teams were also known as the Mauve, the Purple, the Purple and White, the Hilltoppers, and simply as Kenyon. Their colors are purple and white, with black and gold often added as accents.

The men's swim team is notable in NCAA Division III, for having won, from 1980 through 2010, a record 31 consecutive NCAA national championships as well as consecutive titles between 2012 and 2015 for a total of 34 program titles, the most in any sport in NCAA history. The women's swim team is also considered among the best, having won 24 non-consecutive titles of their own since 1984, the most recent being in 2022. Former Swim Coach Jim Steen has coached the most conference titles in any sport in NCAA history. During the 1980s and 90s, Diving Coach Fletcher Gilders led his athletes to fourteen consecutive North Coast Athletic Conference championships and eight individual NCAA Division III titles; Gilders would also earn NCAA D3 Coach of the Year honors on three separate occasions. In 2013, under Head Coach Jess Book, the men's team won the national title and the women's team took second. Book was voted the 2013 NCAA Men's Coach of the Year and the 2013 NCAA Women's Coach of the Year, and Head Diving Coach Andy Scott was voted the 2013 NCAA Division III Women's Diving Coach of the Year.

In 2006, Kenyon opened the $70 million Kenyon Athletic Center (KAC), a  building that houses an Olympic-sized swimming pool, two basketball courts, eight squash courts, a weight room, a 200m track, four tennis courts and other facilities. Field hockey, football and men's lacrosse are played at McBride Field which has a seating capacity of 1,762.

 Traditions 
As Ohio's oldest private college, Kenyon has upheld some traditions for almost 200 years. All students in each entering class are expected to take the Matriculation Oath and sign a Matriculation Book that dates back at least a century.

Another tradition is the "First-Year Sing." Each year, entering first-years gather on the steps of Rosse Hall to sing Kenyon songs before they are officially part of the Kenyon community. On the day before Commencement, seniors gather on the steps of Rosse Hall to sing the same songs again.

Kenyon students avoid stepping on the college seal in the entrance hall of Peirce Dining Hall. Tradition holds that if someone steps on the seal, they will not graduate from the college.

Whenever a new president begins their time at the college, candles are lit in every window of Old Kenyon, as a sign of welcome. Additionally, a bell hangs in the steeple of Old Kenyon and is only rung when a new president is inaugurated, as well as having been rung when the United States is no longer engaged in war and when the Kenyon football team wins a home game. However, the only occasion the bell has been rung in recent years has been the arrival of a new president.
Kenyon has had twenty-five presidents (including acting or interim appointments); former president S. Georgia Nugent was Kenyon's first female president, and current president Sean Decatur is Kenyon's first African-American president. The president's academic regalia is a purple gown with four velvet chevrons on each sleeve signifying the office of the president, a college seal medallion with the names of each Kenyon president on the chain links, and a purple beefeater cap. The purple beefeaters cap is also worn by college trustee's at ceremonies.

The college's official alma mater is "The Thrill." However, "Kokosing Farewell" is more often sung at ceremonies and is sometimes referred to as Kenyon's "spiritual" alma mater. "Kokosing Farewell," sung to the tune of the 1870 hymn "The Day Thou Gavest, Lord, Is Ending," is the traditional closing number for concerts of the Kenyon College Chamber Singers, the student choir. The currently used versions of both songs were arranged by Professor of Music Benjamin R. Locke. 

The college has maintained a tradition of formality at ceremonies. During the annual commencement ceremony, the conferring of degrees to the class and announcement of each individual student's degree of Bachelor of Arts is done entirely in Latin, spoken by the president and faculty secretary. Kenyon's diplomas are also written entirely in Latin.

In 2018, Kenyon gained a campus cat named Moxie. Moxie passed away in 2022.

 Shield and seal 
The first Kenyon seal was designed no later than 1842 and contained a book, a cross, a scroll, a telescope, and a scientific apparatus surrounded by the words "Sigillum Collegi Kenyonensis" and "Ohio Resp". Carvings of the first seal exist on the outer stone walls of Hanna and Ransom Halls in Gambier. Since the second and current seal was introduced, the first seal has rarely been used.

Kenyon's second and current shield is derived from the coat of arms of Lord Kenyon, one of the college's first and most prominent benefactors. The college's board of trustees ordered a committee to create a new shield on July 22, 1908, and its first recorded use was in 1909. However, it wasn't until 1937 that the seal was formally adopted by the trustees. The shield consists of a chevron, three crosses, a book inscribed with the college's motto (as well as the Kenyon family's motto) “Magnanimiter Crucem Sustine” ("valiantly bear the cross"), resting upon a bishop's staff, representing the college's founder, Bishop Philander Chase. The shield has become a widely used symbol for the college. A version of the shield that replaces the book and staff with "Kenyon" in block letters while the chevron and crosses remain has become the symbol for the college's athletic teams.

The college seal consists of the shield at the center, encircled by the Latin phrase "Sigillum Collegi Kenyonensis" (translated to "Seal of Kenyon College") as well as the college's founding year in Roman numerals across the bottom.

In 2011, American clothier Ralph Lauren discontinued production of a necktie depicting the Kenyon shield after it was found they did not license the rights from the college.

The Bexley Seminary had its own shield until its dissociation from the college in 1968. While it contained the book, motto, and bishop's staff of the Kenyon shield, an eagle and ermine pattern blazoned the lower portion of the shield.

 Sustainability 
Kenyon College has undertaken a number of sustainability initiatives, including a recycling system upgrade, a biodiesel project, a computer lab conversion to double-sided printing, the distribution of green living guides, as well as the creation of a dining hall composting system that diverts 6,000 pounds of waste from the landfill per week. Additionally Kenyon's cafeteria is committed to serving local food and has become a leader among college cafeterias in the country.
Students partnered with administrators and professors to complete a campus energy audit for the past three years, as well as a carbon footprint calculation.
Kenyon Green Alumni was founded to connect graduates "with a professional interest in the environment." The college recently received a "C" grade on the 2010 College Sustainability Report Card, compiled by the Sustainable Endowments Institute.

The Kenyon Farm is a mixed crop-livestock operation providing produce to local markets and giving students the opportunity to gain practical skills and knowledge for small-scale farming operations.

Ivy, which once covered some buildings on the Kenyon campus, but damages stonework, has been eradicated.

 People 

Notable alumni of Kenyon College include:
 U.S. Supreme Court Justices David Davis (1832), Stanley Matthews (1840), and William Rehnquist (attended, 1946)
 U.S. Secretary of War Edwin M. Stanton (1834)
 Abolitionist and women's rights activist John Celivergos Zachos (1840)
 U.S. President Rutherford B. Hayes (1842)
 Pulitzer Prize-winning poet Robert Lowell (1940)
 Novelist and short-story writer Peter Taylor (1940)
 National Book Award-winning novelist William H. Gass (1947)
 Swedish Prime Minister Olof Palme (1948)
 Actor Paul Newman (1949)
 Comedian Jonathan Winters (attended, 1950)
 Award-winning writer E.L. Doctorow (1952)
 Pulitzer Prize-winning poet James Arlington Wright (1952)
 Molecular biologist Harvey Lodish (1962)
 Architect Graham Gund (1963)
 Cartoonist and Zits co-creator Jim Borgman (1976)
 Co-founder and former editor-in-chief of Bloomberg News Matthew Winkler (journalist) (1977)
 Professor of Law Amos N. Guiora (1979)
 Cartoonist and Calvin and Hobbes creator Bill Watterson (1980)
 Author and journalist Donovan Webster (1981)
 Oscar and Emmy Award-winning actor Allison Janney (1982)
 U.S. Congressman Zack Space (1983)
 New York Times bestselling author Jenna Blum (1992)
 Venezuelan politician and former mayor of Chacao, Caracas, Venezuela Leopoldo Lopez (1993)
 Actor and filmmaker Josh Radnor of the sitcom How I Met Your Mother (1996)
 U.S. Congresswoman Lizzie Pannill Fletcher (1997)
 NCAA men's basketball coach Shaka Smart (1999)
 New York Times'' bestselling author and YouTube content creator John Green (2000)
 Author and filmmaker Ransom Riggs (2001)
 Entrepreneur and founder of Juul James Monsees (2002)
 Former U.S. National Security Council spokesperson and Crooked Media co-founder Tommy Vietor (2002)
 Astrophysicist and artist Nia Imara (2003)
 Singer and musician Nicholas Petricca of the band Walk the Moon (2009)
 Musician Evan Stephens Hall of the band Pinegrove (2011)
 Musician Justin Roberts (1992)

References

Further reading

External links 

 

 
Private universities and colleges in Ohio
Liberal arts colleges in Ohio
Kenyon College
Historic districts on the National Register of Historic Places in Ohio
Five Colleges of Ohio
Educational institutions established in 1824
1824 establishments in Ohio
School buildings on the National Register of Historic Places in Ohio
Tourist attractions in Knox County, Ohio
National Register of Historic Places in Knox County, Ohio
Buildings and structures in Knox County, Ohio
Universities and colleges affiliated with the Episcopal Church (United States)
Universities and colleges accredited by the Higher Learning Commission